Papyrus Oxyrhynchus 284 (P. Oxy. 284 or P. Oxy. II 284) is a fragment of an Extortion by a Tax-Collector, in Greek. It was discovered in Oxyrhynchus. The manuscript was written on papyrus in the form of a sheet. It is dated to the year about 50. Currently it is housed in the Houghton Library (SM 2219) of the Harvard University in Cambridge.

Description 
The measurements of the fragment are 120 by 161 mm. The document is mutilated.

The document was written by Alexandros, a weaver of Oxyrhynchus, and was addressed to the strategus Tiberius Claudius Pasion. The document states, that a tax-collector, Apollophanes, had unjustly compelled him (i.e. author of this document) to pay 16 drachmae in the year 47-48.

This papyrus was discovered by Grenfell and Hunt in 1897 in Oxyrhynchus. The text was published by Grenfell and Hunt in 1899.

See also 
 Oxyrhynchus Papyri

References 

284
1st-century manuscripts